For the Summer Olympics, there are 25 venues starting with the letter 'W', no venues starting with the letter 'X', three venues starting with the letter 'Y', and four venues starting with the letter 'Z'.

W

X
There are no Summer Olympic venues that started with the letter 'X'. This includes the 2012 Summer Olympics in London and the 2016 Summer Olympics in Rio de Janeiro.

Y

Z

References

 List W-Z